Below is a list of newspapers published in Turkmenistan.

 Türkmenistan
 Watan
 Galkynyş
 Nesil
 Edebiýat we sungat
 Türkmenistanyň Prezidentiniň metbugat çapary gazeti
 Adalat
 Esger
 Mugallymlar gazeti
 Türkmen dünýasi
 Bereketli toprak
 Neutral Turkmenistan - English
 Aşgabat
 Ahal
 Türkmen dili
 Daşoguz habarlary
 Türkmen gündogary
 Maru-şahu jahan
 Zaman Türkmenistan
 Habarlar
 Biznes reklama
Balkan
Neytralnyy Turkmenistan — Russian
 Nebit-gaz

References

Links 
 Newspapers at PDF

Turkmenistan
 
Newspapers
Newspapers